Ramose was the father and Hatnofer the mother of Senenmut, one of the most important state officials under the reign of the Egyptian queen Hatshepsut in the Eighteenth Dynasty of Egypt. The commoner origins of Ramose and the rise of his son Senenmut were long considered to be prime examples of high social mobility in New Kingdom Egypt. For instance, almost nothing is known of Ramose's origins, but he seems to have been a man of modest means—anything from a tenant peasant or farmer, to an artisan or even a small landowner. When Ramose died he was a man aged 50–60 (based on the dental evidence). Hatnofer was an elderly lady, with grey or even white hair.

Tomb of Ramose and Hatnofer

Ramose is known from a few contemporary sources. He appears on the false door and likely, also on the chapel of Senenmut's TT71 tomb chapel. Ramose and Hatnofer's own tomb was not located far from the chapel (TT71) of his son Senemut. The tomb of Ramose contained his mummy as well as that of Hatnofer (Hatnefret), who was the wife of Ramose and mother of Senenmut. It was found intact by Wiliam Hayes and Ambrose Lansing of the Metropolitan Museum's Egyptian expedition in excavation work conducted under a hillside terrace at Sheikh Abd el-Qurna hill in Western Thebes during the 1935-1936 archaeological season. Ramose and Hatnofer were buried in the tomb along with six other anonymous poorly wrapped mummies (three women and three unknown children) who are assumed to be family members of the couple. Initially, Lansing and Hayes interpreted the 6 bodies as grisly evidence that Senenmut's family had been struck by a sudden tragedy:
 ...that eight persons of the same family or group should have died so nearly at the same time that they could be buried together on one occasion is certainly extraordinary, but seems, nevertheless, to be what actually happened.
Some Egyptologists believe that all burials in their tomb took place at the same time.
 However, during the New Kingdom, it was often customary to use a tomb's burial chambers for several family members, who died at different times. As Joyce Tyldesley notes, it is far more likely that these 6 additional bodies represent members of Senenmut's immediate family:
 who had previously been buried nearby; their decayed [mummy] wrappings and disarticulated skeletons encrusted with mud suggest that they too had been retrieved from less impressive cemeteries. The re-burial of private individuals, while not common, was certainly not unknown at this time, and Senenmut's filial devotion would have met with general approval.
Moreover, the Metropolitan Museum archaeologists convincingly demonstrated that the personal possessions in the tomb chamber of Ramose and Hatnofer were Hatnofer's alone since their items were all appropriate for a woman. Of the mummies in the chamber, Hatnofer's alone:
 had been carefully mummified in linen from Hatshepsut's royal estate and equipped with a complete funeral outfit consisting of a gilded mask, a heart scarab, funerary papyri, and canopic equipment. By contrast, Ramose in his painted anthropoid coffin and the other six mummies (three young women and three children) interred in the two plain deal coffins had received no such attention, and their remains were mere skeletons.

These six other burials, all from the early 18th dynasty "were found in the loose scree of the hillside as well as deposits of hunting weapons and the coffins of a horse and an ape." Ramose and Hatnofer's tomb conveys a comparatively simple impression and was initially considered, by Egyptologists, as evidence for the humble personal origins of Ramose in particular.

Ramose and Hatnofer's tomb is notable for featuring the earliest known date from Hatshepsut's reign. A collection of grave goods found in the tomb's chamber contained a single pottery jar or amphorae—which was stamped with the date 'Year 7'. Another jar from the same collection—which was discovered in situ by the Metropolitan Museum of Art expedition—was stamped with the seal of the 'God's Wife Hatshepsut' while two jars bore the seal of The Good Goddess Maatkare. The dating of the amphorae, which had been "sealed into the [tomb's] burial chamber by the debris from Senenmut's own tomb," is certain and establishes that Hatshepsut was recognised by her subjects as the king of Egypt by Year 7 of her reign.

Differing interpretations for the background of Senenmut's parents

Ramose only held the title and non-specific epithet of zab ('the worthy') in his tomb. The excavators of the tomb assumed, therefore, that Ramose was once only a simple farmer since "The Worthy" was "a polite but somewhat meaningless appellation invariably used for the respected dead." However, it is often noted in the archaeological evidence, that many high state officials including some viziers carried the title zab even if it was only a post-mortem reference to them. This title, therefore, states almost nothing about the social origins of Ramose. Since Senenmut was able to join the roughly 10% of Egypt's society who were educated and later won favour as Hatshepsut's chief architect, it seems highly unlikely that Ramose was a mere farmer; Ramose must have instead held a higher position in Egyptian society to enable his son to be literate.

More remarkable, however, is the comparison of the funerals of Ramose with that of his wife Hatnofer. Hatnofer had a rich gilded funerary mask, heart scarab, canopic jars, papyri and "a selection of traditional grave goods suitable for a woman" donated for her interment. In contrast, Ramose's burial only featured his coffin. It is assumed that Hatnofer died when her son had already achieved his high state position under Hatshepsut; hence, the rich funerary goods must have been provided for by her influential son, Senenmut. In contrast, since Ramose was equipped with inferior funerary equipment, Senenmut's position in the Egyptian state was still comparatively minor when his father died. When Hatnofer died of old age between Year 6 or Year 7 of Hatshepsut, Senenmut was now wealthy enough to arrange to have his father Ramose resurrected from "his more lowly resting-place, hastily re-bandaged, placed in a painted anthropoid coffin and re-united with his wife" Hatnofer who had been more expensively mummified in their hillside tomb.

The coffin of Ramose was fitted with gold which thereby implied some social status for him. The absence of an expected rock cut chapel in Ramose and Hatnofer's tomb is not surprising since few New Kingdom tombs featured such a chapel prior to the reign of Hatshepsut. By performing a more careful and critical examination of the sources, it would appear that Ramose was perhaps already a minor official of the early 18th dynasty during his career. The ascent of his son to the highest public offices rests perfectly within the bounds of possibility of Ancient Egyptian society. However, Tyldesley stresses that:
 The Ancient Egyptians did not suffer from any sense of false modesty. They felt that their official titles were an important part of the personality, and it was customary for all ranks and decorations, no matter how trivial, to be recorded for posterity. An Egyptian would only have considered omitting a lowly or unimportant title from his parent's tomb if it had been superseded by more prestigious accolade. We must, therefore, assume that Ramose and Hatnofer, with their rather modest epithets and undistinguished tomb, did not play a prominent role in public life.

Another option is that the tomb of Ramose was robbed shortly after his burial and that Ramose was reburied with his wife when she died. Again, this makes it hard to pinpoint any social background for Ramose and Senenmut, as it would be impossible to make any statements about the quality of his original burial equipment.

Senenmut's mother Hatnofer—the daughter of a lady named Sitdjehuty—was herself simply identified as 'Mistress of the House', which was a very general title awarded to married women. When Hatnofer died, she was a short, at just over five feet tall, but somewhat stout lady of about 60 years old. Hatnofer was interred with several mirrors which were made of highly polished bronze or silver set into wood or metal handles as well as a bronze razor, which was found along with other cosmetic devices inside a basket in her tomb.

References

People of the Eighteenth Dynasty of Egypt
Ancient Egyptian mummies